Egger Island (old spelling: Itivdleq) is Greenland's southernmost island. It is located in the Kujalleq municipality and is uninhabited.

Geography
Egger Island is an important landmark for a small islet off Cape Farewell, its southern headland, is the southernmost point of Greenland. It is part of the Cape Farewell Archipelago (Nunap Isua).

The island has a deeply indented coastline and is separated from the neighbouring islands of the archipelago by narrow sounds. Qunnerit lies to the west, Sammisoq to the north and the smaller Avatdlerssuaq and Saningassoq to the east. Egger Island has an area of 308.8 km2 and a shoreline of 150.2 kilometres.

Cape Farewell lies at the island's southernmost tip, with a height of over 2000 feet; it is noted for bad weather.

See also
List of islands of Greenland
List of countries by southernmost point

References

Uninhabited islands of Greenland
Kujalleq